Leroy F. Greene (January 31, 1918 – September 29, 2002) was a Democratic politician in the State of California. He represented Sacramento County in the State Assembly from 1962 until 1982 and was a California state senator from 1982 to 1998. His thirty-six years of service between the two houses made him the seventh-longest serving member in the history of the California State Legislature.

Legislative career
Greene sponsored many bills and measures in education during his 36 year legislative career such as the Leroy F. Greene School Facilities Act of 1998 which requires the State Allocation Board to certify funding for modernization and construction of school facilities. Other bills introduced by Greene related to consumer food stuffs, earthquake proof building codes and the legalization of Bingo in California. Greene also introduced a bill requiring newborns to be tested for PKU, a brain destroying disorder that can be controlled.
Leroy F. Greene Middle School and Leroy Greene Academy in the Natomas district of Sacramento were named after Greene following his departure from the legislature. Upon his departure, he also became an education consultant and served on the California Medical Assistance Commission.

Private life
Greene married Denny Miller in 1941 who died in 1991. They had a daughter named Dennie. In 1995, Greene married educational lobbyist Syma Reynolds. They remained married until Greene's death in 2002. Syma Reynolds died in December 2012.

References

External links
Join California Leroy F. Greene

Democratic Party California state senators
Democratic Party members of the California State Assembly
1918 births
2002 deaths
20th-century American politicians
United States Army personnel of World War II
Purdue University alumni